OCBC may refer to:

 OCBC Bank (Oversea-Chinese Banking Corporation), a bank based in Singapore
 OCBC Centre, the headquarters of OCBC Bank in Singapore
 Oakland Cannabis Buyers' Cooperative, a medical marijuana cooperative based in Oakland, California